Aldisa erwinkoehleri is a species of sea slugs, a dorid nudibranch, a marine gastropod mollusc in the family Cadlinidae.

Distribution 
This species was described from Thailand. It has been reported from several locations in the Andaman Sea and Similan Islands.

References

Cadlinidae
Gastropods described in 2001